Turonia is an extinct genus of sea sponges belonging to the class Demospongiae.

Fossil records
This genus is known in the fossil record of the Cretaceous of France, Germany, Poland and Spain (about 125 to 66 million years ago).

Species
Turonia cerebriformis Schrammen 1910
Turonia constricta Zittel 1878
Turonia globosa Wagner 1963
Turonia induta Zittel 1878
Turonia variabilis Michelin 1847 (type species)

References

 John Hooper,Rob W.M. van Soest  Systema Porifera: A Guide to the Classification of Sponges
See also List of prehistoric sponge genera

External links
 Cretaceous sponges from the Campanian of Misburg and Höver

Prehistoric sponge genera
Tetractinomorpha